Hypochalcia lignella is a moth of the  family Pyralidae. It is found in central Europe, east to Russia.

External links
 Lepforum

Moths described in 1796
Phycitini
Moths of Europe